South Boston is an area of Boston, Massachusetts.

South Boston may also refer to:
 South Boston, Indiana
 South Boston, Virginia